William Henry Maughan (July 1894 – 2 October 1916) was an English professional footballer who played as a right half in the Football League for Fulham.

Personal life 
Maughan enlisted in the Durham Light Infantry in 1915, during the First World War and achieved the rank of corporal. He was wounded in action during the opening phase of the Battle of Le Transloy and died of wounds at a Casualty Clearing Station in Dernancourt, France on 2 October 1916. Maughan was buried in Dernancourt Communal Cemetery Extension.

Career statistics

References

1894 births
People from South Moor
Footballers from County Durham
English footballers
Association football wing halves
West Stanley F.C. players
Easington Colliery A.F.C. players
Fulham F.C. players
Military personnel from County Durham
English Football League players
British Army personnel of World War I
British military personnel killed in the Battle of the Somme
Durham Light Infantry soldiers
1916 deaths
Date of birth unknown